Frederick Russell (1923–2001) was a Canadian businessman and politician.

Frederick Russell may also refer to:

Frederick F. Russell (1870–1960), American doctor
Frederick Nene Russell (fl. 1868–1886), New Zealand MP
Frederick Stratten Russell (1897–1984), British marine biologist
Frederick Brett Russell (1813–1869), English architect and artist
Fred Russell (1906–2003), American sports writer
Fred Russell (American football) (born 1980), American football running back
Fred Russell (ventriloquist) (1862–1957), English ventriloquist
Fred Russell (bowls) (1890–1972), lawn bowls competitor for New Zealand
Fred J. Russell (1916–2007), American businessman and diplomat